The 50th anniversary of the founding of the People's Republic of China took place on 1 October 1999. A military parade was held in Tiananmen Square in Beijing and various celebrations were conducted all over the country. China's paramount leader Jiang Zemin inspected the troops along Chang'an Avenue in Beijing. This parade was immediately followed by a civilian parade.

Civil-Military Parade

It was the first one to be held since 1984 since the 1989 parade celebrating the 40th anniversary was cancelled due to the Tiananmen Square protests. Known as the Chinese Army's Trans-Century Parade due to 1 October 1999 being months away from the turn of the 21st century, it was commanded by the Commander of Beijing Military Region Li Xinliang and inspected by then-Chairman of the Central Military Commission and General Secretary of the CCP Jiang Zemin. It was the first time that the sole Chinese leader (who served as party leader, head of state and Commander-in-Chief by this time) had inspected the parade. It was also the first time that the national flag was raised before the parade began. 42 divisions (formations) took part in this parade: 17 from the ground column and 25 from the mobile column.

List of participating divisions
In order of appearance (A bolded unit indicates that this is its first appearance):
PLA Beijing Garrison Honor Guard Battalion
PLA National Defence University Cadets
PLA Ground Force Infantry 
PLA Navy Sailors
PLA Marines
PLA Air Force Airman
PLA 15th Airborne Corps
PLA Second Artillery Corps
People's Armed Policemen
PLA Female Soldiers 
PLA Reserve Service Forces
Female Militiawomen

Armored forces and artillery accounted for 70% of the parade while the airborne portion was increased to 10%.

Military bands and parade music

Military bands in attendance
A 1,100 piece band was present for the musical accompaniment to the parade. The bands were organized as follows:

Massed Joint-PLA Military Band under the direction of the Director of Music of the People's Liberation Army Navy Band, Captain Li Xing
Central Military Band of the People's Liberation Army of China
State Trumpeters
People's Liberation Army Navy Band
People's Liberation Army Air Force Female Band
People's Armed Police Band
Women's Military Band of the PLA National Defense University

Music
In order of performance:

 Welcome March (欢迎进行曲)
 March of the Volunteers (National Anthem of the People's Republic of China) (义勇军进行曲)
 Military Anthem of the People's Liberation Army (中国人民解放军进行曲)
 Troops Review March of the PLA (Inspection March of the PLA) (检阅进行曲)
 The People's Army is Loyal to the Party (人民军队忠于党)
 Three Rules of Discipline and Eight Points for Attention (三大纪律八项注意)
 Military Academy Song (军校之歌)
 A Soldier of the People (当兵的人)
 Parade March of the People's Liberation Army (分列式进行曲)
 March of Armored Vehicles (战车进行曲)
 Song of the Loyal Guards (忠诚卫士之歌)
 March of the Artillery Force (炮兵进行曲)
 People's Navy, Forward (人民海军向前进)
 Rocket Forces March 
 March of the PLA Air Force (中国空军进行曲)

References

Notes

Videos
Documentary Film: China's 50th National Day Military Parade 1999 PLA August First Film Stu

Events in Beijing
1999 in China
Anniversaries
Military parades in China
Military history of the People's Republic of China
1999 in military history
October 1999 events in Asia
1990s in Beijing
Turn of the third millennium